Charles Frederick Goldie  (20 October 187011 July 1947) was a New Zealand artist, best known for his portrayal of Māori dignitaries.

Early life
Goldie was born in Auckland on 20 October 1870. He was named after his maternal grandfather, Charles Frederick Partington, who built the landmark Auckland windmill. His father, David Goldie, was a prominent timber merchant and politician, and a strict Primitive Methodist who resigned as Mayor of Auckland rather than toast the visiting Duke and Duchess of Cornwall and York with alcohol. His mother, Maria Partington, was an amateur artist and encouraged his artistic ability. Goldie was educated at Auckland Grammar School, and while still at school won several prizes from the Auckland Society of Arts and the New Zealand Art Students' Association.

Art education
Goldie studied art part-time under Louis John Steele, after leaving school to work in his father's business. A former Governor of New Zealand, Sir George Grey, was impressed by two of Goldie's still-life paintings that were being exhibited at the Auckland Academy of Art (Steele's art society, of which Goldie was honorary secretary) in 1891, and he talked David Goldie into permitting his son to undertake further art training abroad.

Goldie went to Paris to study at the famous Académie Julian. where Goldie received a strong grounding in drawing and painting.

Artistic career

He returned to New Zealand in 1898 and established the "French Academy of Art" with Louis J. Steele, who had been his tutor prior to his departure. They shared a studio and collaborated on the large painting The Arrival of the Māoris in New Zealand, based on Théodore Géricault's The Raft of the Medusa. It depicted exhausted, starved and storm-tossed Polynesian mariners sighting land after a long journey by catamaran. Its representation of a starving crew and fanciful canoe was disdained by contemporary Māori. However, its artistic merits were praised at the time and is said to have launched Goldie's career.

Goldie and Steele parted ways not long afterwards and Goldie established his own studio, Steele apparently resenting the attention accorded to his former pupil. From 1901 he made field trips to meet, sketch and photograph Māori people in their own locations, and he also paid Māori visitors to Auckland to sit for him. Most of these were chiefs visiting the Native Land Court.

Steele trod a path established by Steele's Māori history paintings and portraits of tattooed chiefs. Also influential was his brother William, who in 1901 wrote an article that contradicted predictions of the demise of the Māori and later the journalist and historian James Cowan.

By far the majority of Goldie's subjects were elderly, tattooed Māori of considerable standing in their own society. (The practice of tattooing (Tā moko) was not current at the time due to the influence of colonization, and the remaining examples were mostly elderly; it had also been a practice largely confined to high-status individuals.)

Goldie dedicated his life to painting the Māori chiefs, Māori leaders and their communities who also became his friends.  He lived with them on their various marae and spoke fluent Te Reo Māori. He wanted to preserve the heritage of the Māori people, whom he admired.  Some critics saw the fine detail in his paintings as evidence that he painted from photographs, which he did not.

On 31 October 1920 Goldie travelled to Sydney, where on 18 November at the age of 50 he married 35-year-old Olive Ethelwyn Cooper, an Australian by birth but a resident of Auckland. They did not have any children.

Goldie's health eventually deteriorated through lead poisoning (from the lead white used to prepare his canvases). In order to create the finest of detail in his paintings, he would lick the end of his paint brush to ensure an even finer tip. This was a relatively common practice at that time. He produced little work in the 1920s. Encouraged by the Governor-General, Lord Bledisloe, Goldie resumed painting around 1930; in 1934 and 1935 he exhibited at the Royal Academy of Arts in London, and in 1935, 1938 and 1939; the Salon of the Société des artistes français.

He stopped painting in 1941 and died on 11 July 1947 aged 76. He was buried at Purewa Cemetery in the Auckland suburb of Meadowbank.

Known sitters

Goldie was Auckland based and his subjects were mainly those from the tribes in the upper North Island.
Wiripine Ninia of Ngati Awa
Te Aho-o-te-rangi Wharepu of Ngati Mahuta
Ina Te Papatahi (also known as Ena) of Nga Puhi
Harata Rewiri Tarapata of Nga Puhi
Kamariera Te Hau Takiri Wharepapa of Nga Puhi
Wharekauri Tahuna of Ngāti Manawa
Hori Pokai of Ngati Maru

Honours
In 1935, Goldie was awarded the King George V Silver Jubilee Medal. Soon after, he was appointed an Officer of the Order of the British Empire, for services to art in New Zealand, in the 1935 King's Birthday and Silver Jubilee Honours.

Legacy
Goldie's work is associated with the contemporary belief that the Māori were a "dying race". Many Māori value his images of their ancestors highly. On the rare occasions they are offered for sale they fetch high prices, among the highest for New Zealand paintings.  Goldie is considered among the most important New Zealand artists, and the prices fetched reflect this view.  In 2016 The International Art Gallery sold Goldie's last great artwork.  The 1941 oil portrait of Wharekauri Tahuna was the first painting in New Zealand history to break the $1 million mark, reaching a top price of $1.175 million. In March 2008, NZ$400,000 (NZ$454,000 including buyer's premium) was paid at an International Art Centre auction in Auckland for the painting Hori Pokai - "Sleep, 'tis a gentle thing". Earlier, NZ$530,000 ($589,625 including buyer's premium) was achieved for a Goldie work in an online auction conducted by Fisher Galleries. On 19 November 2010 opera diva Dame Kiri Te Kanawa sold the oil on canvas "Forty Winks", a portrait of Rutene Te Uamairangi for $573,000. This was the most paid for a painting at auction in New Zealand at the time, but was later surpassed by Goldie's portrait Ngāti Manawa chief Wharekauri Tahuna "A Noble Relic of a Noble Race" (sold in 2016 for $1.3Mio), his portrait of Hori Pokai "A Sturdy Stubborn Chief" (sold for $1.7Mio on 16 November 2016), and finally his portrait of chief Kamariera Te Hau Takiri Wharepapa, which sold at auction on 5 April 2022 for $1.8Mio.

Many Goldies are held in public collections, including those at the Auckland Art Gallery, the Auckland Institute and Museum, and the Museum of New Zealand Te Papa Tongarewa. Some descendants of Maori represented in Goldie's paintings object to them being sold as prints. In 2022, a group of descendants of chief Kamariera Te Hau Takiri Wharepapa unsuccessfully attempted to raise the funds necessary to buy the painting at auction.

Forgeries by Karl Sim
The convicted art forger Karl Sim changed his name legally to Carl Feodor Goldie in the 1980s in order to be able to "legitimately" sign his Goldie copies "C.F. Goldie". He no longer tries to pass them off as by the original C.F. Goldie, however. He published an autobiography with Tim Wilson in 2003 called Good as Goldie.

Notes

References
C.F.Goldie: Famous Māori Leaders of New Zealand by Alister Taylor (Alister Taylor Publishers, Auckland, 1993).
C.F. Goldie - Official website of forger Karl Sim aka C.F. Goldie  (link dead 31 Oct 2008)

Further reading
  from the Dictionary of New Zealand Biography

External links

 Auckland Art Gallery Toi o Tāmaki: Works by Charles F Goldie
Works by C.F. Goldie in the collection of the Museum of New Zealand Te Papa Tongarewa
 New Zealand Fine Prints - Find prints of Goldie paintings in New Zealand
 ArtRenewal.org - Reproduces many of Goldie's works.
 Charles Goldie at MuseumSyndicate
 Notes by Una Platts
 C. F. Goldie: New Zealand exhibitions, biography and works for sale

1870 births
1947 deaths
Académie Julian alumni
People educated at Auckland Grammar School
Portrait painters
New Zealand Officers of the Order of the British Empire
20th-century New Zealand painters
20th-century New Zealand male artists
Burials at Purewa Cemetery